Semisi Palu ‘Ifoni Tapueluelu (born October 28, 1949) more commonly known as Semisi Tapueluelu, is a Tongan politician. He is the father of Mateni Tapueluelu.

After working as a prisons superintendent, he went into politics. His career in national politics began when he was elected People's Representative for the tenth constituency of Tongatapu in the November 2010 general election. Standing as a candidate for the Democratic Party of the Friendly Islands, he obtained 26.6% of the vote, seeing off eleven other candidates.

In July 2014 Tapueluelu was dumped as a Democratic Party candidate. He ran as an independent in the 2014 Tongan general election, but was not re-elected.

Honours
National honours
  Order of the Crown of Tonga, Member (6 July 2021).

References

1949 births
Members of the Legislative Assembly of Tonga
Democratic Party of the Friendly Islands politicians
Living people
People from Tongatapu
Members of the Order of the Crown of Tonga